The Visa Water Polo International was the test event for the Water Polo Arena for the 2012 Summer Olympics. It took place from 3–6 May 2012.

Four women's international water polo teams were invited to participate: Great Britain, Australia, the United States, and Hungary. There were two rounds. In the preliminary round, each of the teams will play each other once. All teams will then progress to the final round, where the first- and second-placed teams from the preliminary round play off for the gold medal, and the third- and fourth-placed teams for the bronze medal.

Preliminary round
All times are British Summer Time (UTC+1)

Final round
All times are British Summer Time (UTC+1)

Bronze medal match

Gold medal match

Final ranking

References
Official website

Test Event
2012
Qualification for the 2012 Summer Olympics